Dubovsky is a rural locality (a khutor) and the administrative center of Dubovskoye Rural Settlement, Uryupinsky District, Volgograd Oblast, Russia. The population was 942 as of 2010. There are 9 streets.

Geography 
Dubovsky is located in steppe, 33 km south of Uryupinsk (the district's administrative centre) by road. Golovsky is the nearest rural locality.

References 

Rural localities in Uryupinsky District